Clive Alexander Barnes  (13 May 1927 – 19 November 2008) was an English writer and critic. From 1965 to 1977, he was the dance and theater critic for The New York Times, and, from 1978 until his death, The New York Post. Barnes had significant influence in reviewing new Broadway productions and evaluating the international dancers who often perform in New York City.

Life and career
Barnes was born in Lambeth, London, the only child of ambulance driver Arthur Lionel Barnes (1898-1940) and Freda Marguerite, née Garratt. After their divorce when he was seven, he was raised by his mother. Barnes was educated at Emanuel School in Battersea and St Catherine's College, Oxford. He was the dance and drama critic at the New York Post from 1978 until 2008, and senior consulting editor at Dance Magazine, where he wrote a monthly column called "Attitudes." He also contributed regularly to the British journal Dance Now; he edited and wrote for British newspapers such as The Times, The Daily Express, and the weekly magazine Spectator.

Barnes authored and contributed to numerous books related to theater and the performing arts, particularly dance. These include four volumes of 50 Best Plays of the American Theatre, nine series of Best American Plays (with John Gassner), American Ballet Theatre: A 25 Year Retrospective (with Elizabeth Kaye), the foreword to Masters of Movement: Portraits of America's Great Choreographers (by Rose Eichenbaum), Ballet in Britain Since the War, New York Times Directory of the Theater, Ballet Here and Now, Dance Scene USA, Inside American Ballet Theatre, as well as biographies of Tennessee Williams and Rudolf Nureyev.

The British writer was known for his "lively and enthusiastic approach to criticism" which contributed to an upswing in dance criticism in New York City media. Writing for Variety, Gordon Cox claimed that Barnes "helped nurture the explosion of the form in Gotham in the 1970s." Regarding television, Barnes once wrote: "It is the first truly democratic culture, the first culture available to everyone and entirely governed by what the people want. The most terrifying thing is what people do want."

Honours
He was made a Commander of the Order of the British Empire by Queen Elizabeth II in 1975, and appointed a knight of the Order of the Dannebrog in 1972 by Queen Margrethe II of Denmark.

Marriages
He was married four times. His wives included ballet writer Patricia Winckley, news columnist Amy Pagnozzi, and Royal Ballet dancer Valerie Taylor.

Death
He died from liver cancer on November 19, 2008, in New York City, aged 81.

Clive Barnes Awards
The Clive Barnes Foundation was established in 2009 to administer the Clive Barnes Awards.

References

1927 births
2008 deaths
Alumni of St Catherine's College, Oxford
Commanders of the Order of the British Empire
Critics employed by The New York Times
Dance critics
Deaths from liver cancer
English critics
English male non-fiction writers
English emigrants to the United States
Deaths from cancer in New York (state)
Knights of the Order of the Dannebrog
New York Post people
People educated at Emanuel School
20th-century English male writers